Diplomorpha may refer to:
 Diplomorpha Meisn., a taxonomic synonym of Wikstroemia, a genus of flowering shrubs in the Thymelaeaceae
 Diplomorpha Griff. nom. illeg., a taxonomic synonym of Sauropus, a genus of herbs, shrubs and subshrubs in the Phyllanthaceae, and a later homonym of Diplomorpha Meisn.